A twig is a small thin terminal branch of a woody plant.

Twig, TWiG, or twigs may also refer to:

In computing
Twig (database), an open source object database 
Twig (template engine), an open source template engine for PHP

In the arts
FKA Twigs, an English singer, songwriter, record producer, director, and dancer
Twig (novel), a 1942 book by Elizabeth Orton Jones
Twigs (play), a play by George Furth

Other uses
This Week in Google, technology netcast
Twig World, an educational company in the United Kingdom
Twig, Minnesota, an unincorporated community in Saint Louis County, Minnesota, United States

See also
Teeth cleaning twig
Twiggy (disambiguation)